
Henry Morgan (1825–1884) was an author and Methodist minister in Boston, Massachusetts, in the 19th century.

Biography

Morgan moved to Boston in 1859. "He preached for some time to an independent congregation in the Music Hall. ... He was a popular lecturer."

By 1872 he was pastor and property-owner of the Morgan Chapel, First Independent Methodist Church (est.1861) on Shawmut Avenue (at Indiana Place) in Boston's South End.

Morgan died in 1884. In his will, he gave the Morgan Chapel "property in trust to the Benevolent Fraternity of Churches (Unitarian), with the understanding and proviso that it should be managed by a pastor appointed by the New England conference" of Methodists."

References

Further reading

Works by Morgan
 Ned Nevins: the news boy, or, Street life in Boston. Boston: Lee & Shepard, 1867. 
 Shadowy hand; or, Life-struggles: a story of real life, 2nd ed. Morgan Chapel, Boston: H. Morgan, 1874.
 Boston inside out: a story of real life. 1894 ed.
 The Fallen Priest: Story Founded on Fact. Key and Sequel of 'Boston Inside Out.' Boston: Shawmut Publishing Company, 1882.

External links

 WorldCat
 Google news archive. Articles about Morgan Chapel.
 Morgan Memorial-Goodwill Industries, records at Boston University School of Theology.

Image gallery

19th-century Methodist ministers
American Christian clergy
1825 births
1884 deaths
Clergy from Boston
19th century in Boston
People from South End, Boston
19th-century American clergy